aka Blind Beast vs. Killer Dwarf is a 2001 Japanese horror film directed by Teruo Ishii in his final effort before his 2005 death.

Mieko Tanaka, elected to the Diet in the 2009 Japanese general election, appears in a role that includes a nude scene. This precipitated a surge in its sales that year.

Plot

While returning home after viewing an all-girls opera, dime-novel writer Monzo Kobayashi encounters a strange deformed dwarf dressed in samurai garb carrying a woman's severed arm. Unnerved yet fascinated by the encounter, Monzō begins his own research into dwarfs including the mysterious samurai-clad man. Introduced to investigator Kogoro Akechi by an old friend, Monzō learns about a string of grisly murders involving the same man whom Monzō had encountered. As time wears on, Monzō's fascination soon becomes an obsession as he desperately tries to find the secret behind the murders and the strange man.

Cast
 Lily Franky as Monzō Kobayashi

 Shin'ya Tsukamoto as Kogorō Akechi

 Hisayoshi Hirayama as Mōjuu / Blind Beast

 Little Frankie as Issunbōshi / Dwarf

 Mutsumi Fujita as Ranko Mizuki

 Reika Hashimoto as Yurie Yamano

 Tetsurō Tanba as Dr. Tange

 Kenpachirō Satsuma as Yasukawa, the doll-maker

Release

Home media
The film was released on DVD by Panik House Entertainment on August 22, 2006. It was later released by Synapse Films on September 29, 2009.

See also

 Horrors of Malformed Men

References

External links 
  
  - Japanese Movie Database 
 
 
 

2001 films
2000s erotic films
2000s exploitation films
Films based on short fiction
Films based on works by Edogawa Ranpo
Films directed by Teruo Ishii
Japanese horror films
2000s Japanese-language films
Erotic horror films
2000s Japanese films